Lochner v. New York was a court case.

Lochner may also refer to:

 Lochner (surname)
 12616 Lochner, asteroid
 Lochner era